Peter Eismann  (born April 8, 1957 in Frensdorf) is a German politician, representative of the Christian Social Union of Bavaria.

From 2007 to 2008 he was a member of the Landtag of Bavaria.

See also
List of Bavarian Christian Social Union politicians

References

Christian Social Union in Bavaria politicians
1957 births
Living people